Yuliya Andreyevna Yefimova (also romanized Efimova; born 3 April 1992) is a Russian competitive swimmer. She is the Russian record holder in the 200 metre individual medley (short course), 50 metre breaststroke (short course and long course), 100 metre breaststroke (short course and long course), and 200 metre breaststroke (short course and long course). After making her Olympic debut in 2008, she went on to win the bronze medal in the 200 metre breaststroke in 2012, and silver medals in the 100 metre and 200 metre breaststroke in 2016. She is a six-time World Champion, winning the 50 metre breaststroke in 2009 and 2013, the 100 metre breaststroke in 2015, and the 200 metre breaststroke in 2013, 2017, and 2019. In 2019, she became the first woman to win the 200 metre breaststroke at a FINA World Aquatics Championships three times. She is a former world record holder in the long course 50 metre breaststroke. She has won 109 medals, including 48 gold medals, at Swimming World Cups.

After failing a drug test, Yefimova was disqualified from competition for 16 months, from October 2013 to February 2015, was stripped of her results and medals at the 2013 European Short Course Championships, and four of her world short-course records were invalidated.

Personal life
Yefimova was born in Grozny. However, due to the First Chechen War, her family moved to Volgodonsk soon after. There she took up swimming at the age of six, coached by her father Andrey Yefimov. Until 2011, she lived in Taganrog, where she trained under Irina Vyatchanina and studied at the Southern Federal University. In March 2011, she moved to California, United States, where she was coached by Dave Salo, the head coach of the University of Southern California swimming team.

Swimming career

2007–2009: World record at 17 years of age
Yefimova's first notable achievement was winning the 50 metre, 100 metre, and 200 metre breaststroke titles at the 2007 European Short Course Swimming Championships. At 15 years of age, she set her first European record and Russian national record in the short course 200 metre breaststroke with her time of 2:19.08 in the final that won her the gold medal in the event. At the 2008 European Aquatics Championships she was the gold medalist in the 200 metre breaststroke and the silver medalist in the 50 metre breaststroke. Yefimova competed at the 2008 Summer Olympics in Beijing when she was 16, placing fourth in the 100 metre breaststroke and fifth in the 200 metre breaststroke. In the prelims heats of the 100 metre breaststroke, she ranked second overall, swimming a new European record and Russian record time of 1:06.08 and finishing behind only Leisel Jones of Australia. At the 2009 World Aquatics Championships in Rome, Italy, Yefimova won the gold medal in the 50 metre breaststroke in a world record time of 30.09 seconds at 17 years of age.

2010–2013
Yefimova won gold medals at the 2010 European Aquatics Championships in the 50 metre and 100 metre breaststroke events. The following year, at the 2011 World Aquatics Championships, she won the silver medal in the 200 metre breaststroke with a Russian record time of 2:22.22, finishing less than one second behind the gold medalist in the event Rebecca Soni of the United States. In 2012, she earned the bronze medal in the 200 metre breaststroke at the 2012 Summer Olympics with a new European record time of 2:20.92. A year later, at the 2013 World Aquatics Championships in Barcelona, Yefimova triumphed in the 200 metre breaststroke with a time of 2:19.41. In the 50 metre breaststroke prelims heats, she achieved a new world record of 29.78 seconds. She won the finals, finishing first in 29.52 seconds. She proceeded to win four gold medals at the 2013 Summer Universiade in Kazan, Russia in August.

Suspension, disqualifications
In January 2014, it was announced that Yefimova had failed an out of competition drug test in October 2013. Her positive test was for DHEA, an endogenous steroid hormone banned in professional sports. On 13 May 2014, she was disqualified by FINA for 16 months, from 31 October 2013 to 28 February 2015. She was stripped of her results and medals at the 2013 European Short Course Championships. Her four world short-course records (two relays and the 50 metre and 200 metre breaststroke set in November/December 2013) were also invalidated.

2015 World Aquatics Championships

In August 2015, after 16 months of disqualification due to the positive drug test, Yefimova competed at the World Aquatics Championships in Kazan (the site of the 2013 Universiade where she last competed). She won a gold medal in the 100 metre breaststroke with a time of 1:05.66 that was seven tenths of a second faster than the next fastest swimmer, Rūta Meilutytė of Lithuania. In the 50 metre breaststroke Yefimova won the bronze medal at 30.13 seconds. In the 200 metre breaststroke she placed 17th in the prelims heats with a time of 2:26.11 and did not advance to the semifinals. She also placed fifth in the 4 × 100 metre mixed medley relay, splitting a 1:05.46 for the breaststroke leg of the relay.

2016
Between 15 February and 30 March 2016, Yefimova tested positive for meldonium six times in total. She was provisionally suspended from international competition by the International Swimming Federation (FINA) on 14 March. With no research on how long the drug stayed in a person's system, she was not banned or given a suspension. In June 2016, Yefimova returned to competition at the Los Angeles Invitational, winning the 200 metre breaststroke with a time of 2:22.77.

2016 Summer Olympics

Yefimova was the silver medalist at the 2016 Summer Olympics in the 100 metre breaststroke and 200 metre breaststroke. She also helped set a new Russian national record as part of the 4 × 100 metre medley relay that placed sixth with a time of 3:55.66 in the finals, splitting the fastest breaststroke leg of all finals relays with a time of 1:04.98.

Yefimova's participation in the 2016 Summer Olympics was controversial due to doping within the Russian Olympic team. She was initially banned from participation due to her previous doping suspension, but this ban was overturned by the Court of Arbitration for Sport, allowing her to compete. During the Games, she was booed by Brazilian spectators during each of her races. Yefimova was also criticized for taking performance-enhancing drugs by other swimmers, including Lilly King, who won the gold medal in the 100 metre breaststroke. Yefimova won the silver, and during the news conference afterwards, she was "on the verge of tears from the opening question about the boos directed at her." After Yefimova won silver in the 100 metre breaststroke, ESPN pushed back directly against her presence at the 2016 Olympic Games, stating "Yulia Efimova shouldn't have been in Rio at all".

2017
At the 2017 New South Wales State Open Championships in March in Sydney, Australia, Yefimova won the 200 metre breaststroke event with a time of 2:28.80. She also won the 100 metre breaststroke with a time of 1:06.55. A month later, she won the 50 metre breaststroke at the 2017 Russian Championships with a time of 29.88 seconds.

2017 World Aquatics Championships

In July, at the 2017 World Aquatics Championships in Budapest, Hungary, Yefimova won the bronze medal in the 100 metre breaststroke in 1:05.05, finishing 0.92 seconds after the gold medalist, Lilly King, and 0.02 seconds after the silver medalist, Katie Meili. Her time of 1:04.36 in the semifinals set a new Russian record in the event. Three days later, she won the 200 metre breaststroke in 2:19.64, which was over two seconds faster than the next fastest swimmer and silver medalist in the event, Bethany Galat, and gave her the fifth World Championships title of her career. In the 4 × 100 metre medley relay, Yefimova won a silver medal and set a new European record and a new national record with her relay teammates in a time of 3:53.58; she split the fastest breaststroke leg out of all finals relays by over four tenths of a second with a time of 1:04.03. For the 50 metre breaststroke Yefimova won the silver medal in a time of 29.57 seconds, which was less than two tenths of a second slower than gold medalist Lilly King and over four tenths of a second faster than bronze medalist Katie Meili. In the 200 metre individual medley, Yefimova placed 14th in the semifinals with a time of 2:12.88 and did not qualify for the final.

2018 European Aquatics Championships
In August 2018, at the 2018 European Aquatics Championships, held at Tollcross International Swimming Centre in Glasgow, Scotland, Yefimova won the gold medal in the 100 metre breaststroke with a championships record time of 1:05.53 in the final, breaking her own championships record she set in the semifinals at 1:05.87. In the 4 × 100 metre mixed medley relay, Yefimova split a 1:05.07 for the breaststroke leg of the relay, helping achieve a time of 3:42.71 with Kliment Kolesnikov, Svetlana Chimrova, and Vladimir Morozov to win the silver medal and set a new Russian record. Yefimova ranked fourteenth in the prelims heats of the 200 metre individual medley, qualified for the semifinals, and withdrew from competition, forgoing competing in the semifinals. She won the gold medal in the 200 metre breaststroke with a time of 2:21.31. In the 50 metre breaststroke, Yefimova won the gold medal after setting a championships record of 29.66 seconds in the semifinals. For the breaststroke leg of the 4 × 100 metre medley relay, Yefimova split a 1:03.95, helping win the gold medal and set a new championships record at 3:54.22. Yefimova was one of three swimmers to win four gold medals at the 2018 European Aquatics Championships along with Adam Peaty of Great Britain and Sarah Sjöström of Sweden.

2019 World Aquatics Championships

At the 2019 World Aquatics Championships in Gwangju, South Korea in July, Yefimova won the silver medal in the 100 metre breaststroke, finishing less than six-tenths of a second behind Lilly King of the United States with a time of 1:05.49. In the 200 metre breaststroke, Yefimova won the gold medal and became the first woman to win the 200 metre breaststroke world title at a World Aquatics Championships three times, finishing over two seconds ahead of Tatjana Schoenmaker of South Africa with a time of 2:20.17. Yefimova won the bronze medal in the 50 metre breaststroke, finishing third behind gold medalist Lilly King and silver medalist Benedetta Pilato of Italy in 30.15 seconds.

2020 European Aquatics Championships
On 19 May 2021, Yefimova placed fourth in the 100 metre breaststroke at the 2020 European Aquatics Championships held at Danube Arena in Budapest, Hungary. The next day, Yefimova placed fourth as part of the 4 × 100 metre mixed medley relay, swimming the breaststroke leg of the relay and helping to finish in a time of 3:43.60. In the 200 metre breaststroke final on 21 May 2021, Yefimova won the bronze medal with a time of 2:22.16. She won a bronze medal in the 50 metre breaststroke as well, finishing with a 30.22 after gold medalist Benedetta Pilato and silver medalist Ida Hulkko of Finland. In the 4 × 100 metre medley relay, Yefimova won a silver medal, splitting a 1:05.77 for the breaststroke leg of the relay.

2020 Summer Olympics

Yefimova competed at the 2020 Summer Olympic Games for the Russian Olympic Committee, as the Russian team again faced restrictions in the wake of the state-sponsored doping scandal. The restrictions were imposed by the Court of Arbitration for Sport and would last 24 months from December 2020 to December 2022.

At the 2020 Summer Olympics in Tokyo, Japan, held in the summer of 2021 due to the COVID-19 pandemic, Yefimova competed in two events. For the preliminary heats of the 100 metre breaststroke, she ranked eighth with a time of 1:06.21 and advanced to the semifinals, where she qualified for the final with a time of 1:06.47 and overall fifth-rank. In the final, she placed fifth with her time of 1:06.02. Her team was seventh in the prelims heats of the 4 × 100 metre medley relay and then placed seventh in the finals relay as well.

2021 Swimming World Cup

Stop 3: Doha

Yefimova competed in the third stop of the short course 2021 FINA Swimming World Cup in Doha, Qatar. She joined the competition at the Doha stop, the third of four stops in the year's World Cup circuit, after deciding not to compete at the first two stops. Yefimova entered to compete in all breaststroke events available to female swimmers at the Doha stop, which were the 50 metre breaststroke, 100 metre breaststroke, and 200 metre breaststroke races.

On the first day of competition, Yefomiva won the gold medal in the final of the 200 metre breaststroke, finishing over one second ahead of the next fastest swimmer with her time of 2:22.19. The next day she backed up her gold medal performance with another, this time winning the gold medal in the 100 metre breaststroke in a time of 1:06.08. In her final race of the Doha World Cup stop on day three, Yefimova won her third gold medal, swimming a time of 30.11 seconds in the final of the 50 metre breaststroke to win the event.

Stop 4: Kazan

For the fourth and final stop of the World Cup circuit, and Yefimova's second stop, FINA noted her as someone to follow in the breaststroke events before the start of competition on 28 October at the Palace of Water Sports in Kazan.

In the morning of day one of competition, Yefimova ranked third across all prelims heats in the 200 metre breaststroke with her time of 2:25.54 and qualified for the final in the evening. She finished second in the final with a time of 2:20.49, winning the silver medal in the event. The following morning, on 29 October, Yefimova advanced to the final ranked second for the 100 metre breaststroke from the prelims heats where she swam a 1:06.24. She dropped almost two seconds off her time from the prelims heats to win the gold medal in the final of the 100 metre breaststroke with a time of 1:04.56 that was one-hundredth of a second faster than the second-place finisher. On the last day of World Cup competition, Yefimova ranked first in the prelims heats of the 50 metre breaststroke with a time of 30.21, two-hundredths of a second ahead of the next-fastest competitor. In the final of the 50 metre breaststroke, she won the silver medal with a time of 29.65 seconds, one-hundredth of a second behind the gold medal winner in the event, Nika Godun. When points were summed across all four World Cup stops, Yefimova ranked tenth in terms of overall score for female competitors, second for female competitors from a country that hosted at least one World Cup stop, and first for female Russian competitors. Her total of six medals, four gold medals and two silver medals, ranked her eighth in total medals won by a female competitor.

2022: Suspension
In response to the Russian invasion of Ukraine, LEN enacted and implemented a ban on Russian and Belarusian athletes on 3 March 2022, which suspended them from all competitions, including the 2022 European Aquatics Championships, with no date of re-entry communicated at the time the ban took effect. The second ban came from FINA, which barred all Russians and Belarusians from their competitions effective 21 April 2022 and lasting at least through 31 December 2022. The non-FINA events (such as the Russian Championships) were not impacted, and she and other Russian athletes could compete in them, although their times did not count towards world rankings nor world records.

Olympic Games and world championships results

Career best times

Long course metres (50 m pool)

Short course metres (25 m pool)

Legend: NR — Russian record

Swimming World Cup circuits
The following medals Yefimova has won at Swimming World Cup circuits.

World records

Long course metres

Legend: h — heat

Continental and national records

Long course metres

Short course metres

Awards and honours
 Russian Female Swimmer of the Year (2008 and 2015)
 Honorary citizen of Volgodonsk (since 2008)
 Medal of the Order "For Merit to the Fatherland" (2012)
 Order of Friendship (2016)
 Sportswoman of the Year from the All-Russia Swimming Federation (2017)
 SwimSwam, Top 100 (Women's): 2021 (#7), 2022 (#85)

References

External links

1992 births
Living people
Doping cases in swimming
European Aquatics Championships medalists in swimming
Medalists at the 2012 Summer Olympics
Medalists at the 2013 Summer Universiade
Medalists at the 2016 Summer Olympics
Medalists at the FINA World Swimming Championships (25 m)
Olympic bronze medalists for Russia
Olympic bronze medalists in swimming
Olympic silver medalists for Russia
Olympic silver medalists in swimming
Olympic swimmers of Russia
Russian female breaststroke swimmers
Russian female medley swimmers
Russian sportspeople in doping cases
Sportspeople from Grozny
Swimmers at the 2008 Summer Olympics
Swimmers at the 2012 Summer Olympics
Swimmers at the 2016 Summer Olympics
Swimmers at the 2020 Summer Olympics
Universiade gold medalists for Russia
Universiade medalists in swimming
World Aquatics Championships medalists in swimming
World record setters in swimming